Generation Y is the demographic cohort born between 1981 and 1996, commonly called Millennials.

Generation Y or Generation Why may also refer to:

Music
 "Generation Why" (song), a 2009 song by Kisschasy
 "Why Generation", a song by FIDLAR from the 2015 album Too
 "Generation Why", a song by The Reverend Horton Heat from the 1996 album It's Martini Time
 "Generation Why", a song by singer-songwriter Weyes Blood from the 2016 album Front Row Seat to Earth
 Generationwhy, a 2016 album by Zhu
"Generation Why", a song by singer-songwriter Conan Grey from the 2018 EP Sunset Season

Other uses
 Generation Why (podcast), a true crime podcast
 "Generation Why" (Ms. Marvel), the first episode of the 2022 American TV series Ms. Marvel
 Generation Y or Generación Y, a blog by Yoani Sánchez
 Post-80s, China's Generation Y, born between 1980 and 1989

See also
 Generation Yes (disambiguation)